Alexis François Chalbos (6 March 1736 – 17 March 1803) was a French general of the French Revolutionary Wars.

In 1751, he joined the régiment de Normandie as a private.  In June 1789 he was promoted to captain, then to general in 1793.  He served especially in the War in the Vendée, for a short time succeeding Jean Léchelle as commander in chief of the Army of the West.  He ended his career in command of the forces in the stronghold at Mainz.

Sources

1736 births
1803 deaths
French generals
Military leaders of the French Revolutionary Wars
French Republican military leaders of the French Revolutionary Wars
Republican military leaders of the War in the Vendée
People from Lozère